2 States: The Story of My Marriage commonly known as 2 States is a 2009 novel written by Chetan Bhagat. It is the story about a couple coming from two states in India, who face hardships in convincing their parents to approve of their marriage. Bhagat wrote this novel after quitting his job as an investment banker. This is his fourth book after Five Point Someone, One Night @ the Call Center and The Three Mistakes of My Life.

Plot summary 

2 States: The Story of My Marriage is autobiographical with only names changed. The story is about a couple Krish and Ananya, who hail from two states of India, Punjab and Tamil Nadu, respectively, who are deeply in love and want to marry. It is narrated from a first-person point of view in a humorous tone, often taking digs at both Tamil and Punjabi cultures.

The story begins in the IIM Ahmedabad mess hall where Krish, a Punjabi boy from Delhi sights a beautiful girl Ananya, a Tamilian from Chennai quarreling with the mess staff about the food. Ananya was tagged as the "Best girl of the fresher batch". They become friends within a few days. Both graduate and get jobs with serious plans for their wedding. At first, Krish tries to convince his girlfriend Ananya's parents by helping Ananya's brother Manju IIT tuition and by helping her father Swaminathan create his first PowerPoint presentation. He later convinces her mom by helping her fulfill her biggest dream of singing at a concert by arranging for her to perform at the concert organised by Krish's employer City Bank.

With Ananya's parents convinced, the couple then has to convince Krish's mother. But they run into problems as Krish's mother's relatives don't quite like the relationship and do not want Krish to marry a Tamilian. They are won over after Ananya intervenes to help one of Krish's cousins get married. Now as they have convinced both their parents, they decide to make a trip to Goa to give their parents an opportunity to get to know each other. But this too ends badly as Ananya's parents have a fallout with Krish's mother after which they leave, deciding that the families can never get along. Krish returns home and becomes a depressed workaholic.

Throughout the story, Krish was not on good terms with his father and doesn't share a close bond with him. But finally, it is revealed that Krish's father travels to Chennai to meet Ananya's parents and successfully convinces them by spending a day with them. Thus, father and son are reconciled and the novel ends with Ananya giving birth to twin boys. Krish says that the babies belong to a state called 'India', with a thought to end inequality.

Film adaptation

When a film adaptation of the novel was first announced, it was to be directed by Siddharth Anand and the lead roles were played by Saif Ali Khan and Priyanka Chopra. The music was to be composed by Vishal–Shekhar. However, the project was called off due to creative differences over the script.

Later, it was announced that the screen adaptation of 2 States would be produced by Sajid Nadiadwala with Shah Rukh Khan and Priyanka Chopra in the lead roles and Vishal Bhardwaj would be directing the movie.

However, since Shahrukh Khan did not want to appear in back to back romantic movies, the director had to look at other options. It was later declared that Imran Khan will be playing the male lead in the movie. But then, due to clash of dates, Imran and Priyanka had to opt out of the movie as well. After a lot of brainstorming, it was finally confirmed by producers Karan Johar and Sajid Nadiadwala that Arjun Kapoor and Alia Bhatt will be seen playing the lead pair in the movie. Amrita Singh and Ronit Roy were cast as Arjun Kapoor's parents and Revathy and Shiv Kumar Subramaniam were cast as Alia Bhatt's parents.

This movie was released on 18 April 2014.

References

External links
2 States @ author's official website
2 States @ GoodReads.com
 2 States
 2 States pdf 
 2 States book

2009 Indian novels
Novels based on actual events
Novels set in India
Indian Institute of Management Ahmedabad
Rupa Publications books
Indian novels adapted into films
Novels by Chetan Bhagat